The Type 94 90 mm mortar was a 90 mm smoothbore infantry mortar, introduced in 1935, used by the Japanese in World War II. The Type 94 designation was given to this gun as it was accepted in the year 2594 of the Japanese calendar (1934).

Design

By giving the Type 94 an especially heavy and stable mount and bipod, a massive shock absorber group, a powerful projectile, and a lengthy tube and heavy powder charge capacity for long range, Japanese designers intended the weapon to serve as a substitute field or artillery piece that could be hauled in pieces to remote locations, a useful attribute for an army short on transport as well as modern towed large-caliber field howitzers and artillery. The Type 94 had a range of some 4000 yards.

Combat record
The Type 94 was encountered throughout the war in China. In the Pacific campaign, it was first used against U.S. forces in the Philippines, and later at the Battle of Guadalcanal.  Because of its weight, it was normally employed in static siege or defense situations. Japanese forces sometimes went to great lengths to transport these heavy mortars to remote jungle locations when preparing defensive works.

References

Notes

Bibliography
 TM E-30-480 at hyperwar.org
 http://www3.plala.or.jp/takihome/
  War Department Special Series No 25 Japanese Field Artillery October 1944

External links
Shell diagram at Lonesentry.com

World War II infantry weapons of Japan
Infantry mortars of Japan
90 mm artillery
9
Military equipment introduced in the 1930s